Shir Khvorosht (also Romanized as Shīr Khvorosht and Shīr Khowrosht) is a village in Simakan Rural District, in the Central District of Bavanat County, Fars Province, Iran. At the 2006 census, its population was 13, in 5 families.

References 

Populated places in Bavanat County